Mount Erie may refer to:

Mount Erie, Illinois, a village in the U.S. state of Illinois
Mount Erie (Washington), an area and mountain near the U.S. town of Anacortes, Washington

See also
Mount Eerie, band
Mount Eerie, album by the Microphones